Robert Lucian Țicămucă (born 19 June 1999) is a Romanian professional footballer who plays as a forward for Unirea Braniștea.

References

External links
 
 

1999 births
Living people
Sportspeople from Galați
Romanian footballers
Association football forwards
Liga I players
Liga II players
Liga III players
ASC Daco-Getica București players
ASC Oțelul Galați players